John Roebling House is a historic home located at Saxonburg, Butler County, Pennsylvania. It was built between 1832 and 1835, and is a two-story, brick and frame dwelling on a partially exposed basement.  A two-story rear addition was built about 1904.  Included in the listing is the Roebling Shop.  It was built in 1841, and is a one-story, gable-roofed frame building covered in clapboard.  It was the shop of noted civil engineer John A. Roebling (1806-1869), who was also a founder of Saxonburg.  Sometime after its listing, the shop was moved from its original location at the intersection of Rebecca and Main Streets, to Roebling Park, along Rebecca Street.

It was listed on the National Register of Historic Places in 1976.

References

Houses on the National Register of Historic Places in Pennsylvania
Houses completed in 1835
Houses in Butler County, Pennsylvania
Relocated buildings and structures in Pennsylvania
National Register of Historic Places in Butler County, Pennsylvania
Roebling family